Coex Convention & Exhibition Center (Coex) located in Samseong-dong of Gangnam-gu district, Seoul, is one of South Korea's convention and exhibition centers.

Coex is serviced by Samseong Station on line 2 and Bongeunsa Station on line 9 of the Seoul Subway.

The 836-meter (914-yard) section of sidewalk along Yeongdong Boulevard from exit No. 5 of Samseong Station on Seoul Subway Line 2 to exit No. 7 of Bongeunsa Station on Seoul Subway Line 9, outside Convention & Exhibition Center and ASEM Tower is designated as a smoke-free zone by the Seoul Metropolitan Government.

Notable events
 The 2000 Asia-Europe Summit (ASEM)
2010 G-20 Seoul summit - November 2010
 2012 Nuclear Security Summit - 26–27 March 2012
 International Congress on Mathematical Education - 8–15 July 2012
 TVing OSL Finals - 28 July 2012
 Seoul Motor Show

References

External links 

 Coex: Seoul Convention Bureau
 About Larry Oltmanns and the Korea World Trade Center

World Trade Center Seoul
Convention centers in South Korea
1979 establishments in South Korea
Commercial buildings completed in 1979
20th-century architecture in South Korea